Cerradomys goytaca is a species of rodent from South America in the genus Cerradomys. It occurs only in sandy plains in southeastern Brazil.

References

Tavares, William Corrêa, Leila Maria Pessôa, and Pablo Rodrigues Gonçalves, 2011, New species of Cerradomys from coastal sandy plains of southeastern Brazil (Cricetidae: Sigmodontinae), Journal of Mammalogy, vol. 92, no. 3, pp. 645–658 

Mammals of Brazil
Cerradomys
Mammals described in 2011